Oltmanns may refer to:

Caroline Oltmanns (born 1962), German pianist
Friedrich Oltmanns (1860–1945), German psychologist
Larry Oltmanns (born 1951), American architect
Reimar Oltmanns (born 1949), German journalist
Torsten Oltmanns (born 1964), German author and economist